James Butler, 9th Earl of Ormond and 2nd Earl of Ossory ( – 1546), known as the Lame (Irish: Bacach), was in 1541 confirmed as Earl of Ormond thereby ending the dispute over the Ormond earldom between his father, Piers Butler, 8th Earl of Ormond, and Thomas Boleyn, 1st Earl of Wiltshire. He died from poison in London.

Birth and origins 

James was born about 1496 in Ireland. He was the eldest son of Piers Butler, 8th Earl of Ormond and his wife Margaret FitzGerald.

At the time of his birth, his father was a contender in line for the succession of Thomas Butler, 7th Earl of Ormond, being a descendant of James Butler, 3rd Earl of Ormond. His father's family, the Butlers, were an Old English dynasty that descended from Theobald Walter, who had been appointed chief butler of Ireland by King Henry II in 1177.

Thomas's mother was a daughter of Gerald FitzGerald, 8th Earl of Kildare and his first wife, Alison FitzEustace. Her family, the Geraldines, also were an Old English family. His parents had married in 1485. He was one of nine siblings, who are listed in his father's article.

Early life 
As a young man Butler went with Henry VIII to France and was wounded in a leg at the siege of Thérouanne in 1513, hence his surname the Lame or Bocach. 

On 3 August 1515, the 7th Earl of Ormond died in London. His father was heir male and succeeded. About 1520 James joined the household of Cardinal Wolsey, who praised him as a young gentleman "both wise and discreet". In early 1522, it was proposed by King Henry VIII that he marry his cousin Anne Boleyn, who was the great-granddaughter of Thomas Butler, 7th Earl of Ormond. The purpose was to resolve a dispute between her father, Thomas Boleyn, 1st Earl of Wiltshire, and his father over the Ormond inheritance and title; Wolsey himself supported the proposal. The marriage negotiation came to a halt for unknown reasons. On 18 February 1528, the King forced his father to resign the earldom of Ormond, which was given to Thomas Boleyn.

Marriage and children 
In 1530 Butler married Joan Fitzgerald. She was the daughter and heiress of the other great Munster landholder, the 10th Earl of Desmond and his wife Amy O'Brien.

 
James and Joan had seven sons:
Thomas Butler, 10th Earl of Ormond (1531–1614), known as Black Tom, the 10th Earl of Ormond, his successor
Edmund (1534–1602), of Cloughgrenan, married Eleanor Eustace and had three sons, among whom were Theobald of Tulleophelim
John (before 1546 – 1570), of Kilcash, married Katherine MacCarty, daughter of Cormac na Haoine MacCarthy Reagh, 10th Prince of Carbery, and had a son Walter
Walter (died 1560) of Nodstown
James of Duiske, married Margaret, daughter of James Tobin
Edward of Ballinahinch, married first Eleanor FitzGerald, daughter of James Fitzjohn FitzGerald, 13th Earl of Desmond, and secondly Mary Bourke, daughter of Richard Burke, 4th Earl of Clanricarde by his wife Frances Walsingham
Piers of Grantstown married Katherine, daughter of John, 2nd Lord Power of Curraghmore

Career 
One of the heirs general to the Ormond inheritance was Thomas Boleyn, whose mother was a Butler. Boleyn was the father of Anne, whose star was rising at the court of King Henry VIII of England. As the king wanted the titles of Ormond and Wiltshire for Thomas Boleyn, he induced Piers Butler's father and his coheirs to resign their claims on 18 February 1528. Aided by the king's Chancellor, Cardinal Thomas Wolsey, Butler was granted the earldom of Ossory instead.

Butler was created, in 1535, Viscount Thurles. In 1537, Thomas Boleyn, Earl of Ormond died without a son, whereupon the King on 22 February 1538, restored the earldom of Ormond to Butler's father.

Viscount Thurles's father died on 26 August 1539 and was buried in St Canice's Cathedral, Kilkenny. Thurles succeeded as the 9th Earl of Ormond and was confirmed by Act of Parliament, 6 November 1541, in the Earldom of Ormond, with the pre-eminence of the original earls. Cokayne, in his Complete Peerage numbers him the 10th Earl of Ormond because he counts Thomas Boleyn as the 9th.

In the early 1540s, Lord Ormond, as he now was, gradually restored the Butler dynasty to their former position of influence, leading to antagonism from the quarrelsome Lord Deputy of Ireland, Sir Anthony St Leger. St Leger gave Ormond command of the Irish forces in the Anglo-Scottish War of 1544. On the face of it, this was an honour, but allies of Ormond accused St Leger of deliberately sending Ormond into danger.

Ormond himself demanded an inquiry into claims that St Leger had planned his murder, and the matter was thought to merit a Privy Council investigation; the Council found in favour of St Leger and he and Ormond were ordered to work together amicably in future.

Poisoning and timeline 
On 17 October 1546, James was in London with many of his household. They were invited to dine at Ely Palace in Holborn. He was poisoned along with his steward, James Whyte, and 16 of his household. He died eleven days later, on 28 October, leaving Joan a widow in her thirties.

It is surprising, in view of Ormond's high social standing, that no proper investigation into his death was carried out. Whoever was behind the poisoning remains a mystery. His host at the dinner, John Dudley, 1st Duke of Northumberland, though he could be notably ruthless towards his enemies, had no motive for the crime, as he had no quarrel with Ormond. A recent historian remarks that it would be an extraordinary coincidence if St Leger had no part in the sudden and convenient removal of his main Irish opponent.

Offices held 
 Esquire of the Body to King Henry VIII, (1527)
 Lord High Treasurer of Ireland, (1532–1546)
 Privy Counsellor of Ireland, (1535)
 Admiral of Ireland, (1535–1539) 
 Constable of Kilkea Castle, (1537)
 Constable of Carlow Castle, (1537)
 General in the Irish Forces, (1545)

See also 
 Hore Abbey
 Kells Priory which came into the Earl's possession in March 1540 following the Dissolution of the monasteries.

Notes and references

Notes

Citations

Sources 

 
 
 
  – N to R (for Ormond)
  – Scotland and Ireland
 
 
 
 
  – (for timeline)
 
  – Viscounts (for Viscount Mountgarret)
 
 
 

1490s births
1546 deaths
15th-century Anglo-Irish people
15th-century Irish people
16th-century Irish people
James
Deaths by poisoning
Earls of Ormond (Ireland)
Peers of Ireland created by Henry VIII 
Unsolved murders in England

Year of birth uncertain